Kristijan Vulaj (born 25 June 1998) is a Montenegrin footballer who plays as a midfielder for Vllaznia Shkodër and the Montenegro national team.

Career
Vulaj made his international debut for Montenegro on 27 March 2021 in the 2022 FIFA World Cup qualifiers, coming on as a substitute at 27th minute in place of injured Marko Bakić against Gibraltar. The home match finished as a 4–1 win.

Personal life
Vulaj is of Albanian descent.

Career statistics

International

References

External links
 
 2019–20 Dečić statistics

1998 births
Living people
Montenegrin footballers
Montenegro youth international footballers
Montenegro international footballers
Albanians in Montenegro
Association football midfielders
FK Dečić players
OFK Petrovac players
Montenegrin First League players
Montenegrin Second League players